Membrane-associated guanylate kinase, WW and PDZ domain-containing protein 3 is an enzyme that in humans is encoded by the MAGI3 gene.

Interactions
MAGI3 has been shown to interact with PTPRB and PTEN.

References

Further reading